Allomedmassa is a genus of spiders in the family Corinnidae. It was first described in 2014 by Dankittipakul & Singtripop.  it contains 3 species, all from southeast Asia.

References

Corinnidae
Araneomorphae genera
Spiders of Asia